The 1979–80 Anglo-Scottish Cup was the fifth edition of the tournament. It was won by St Mirren, who beat Bristol City in a two-legged final by 5–1 on aggregate and by becoming the only Scottish side to win the trophy.

English Group

Group A

Group B

Group C

Group D

Scottish Group

1st Round 1st Leg 
{|
|-
|valign="top"|

1st Round 2nd Leg 
{|
|-
|valign="top"|

Quarter-finals 1st Leg

Quarter-finals 2nd Leg

Semi-finals 1st Leg

Semi-finals 2nd Leg

Final 1st Leg

Final 2nd Leg

Notes and references

1979–80 in English football
1979–80 in Scottish football